This is a list of significant documents related to the history of the Constitution of Canada, some of which constitute part of the Constitution itself. (see List of Canadian constitutional documents for a list of documents that make up the Constitution).

Pre-Confederation 
 Articles of Capitulation of Quebec (September 18, 1759)
 Articles of Capitulation of Montreal (September 8, 1760)
 Treaty of Paris (1763) (February 10, 1763)
 British Royal Proclamation of 1763 (October 7, 1763)
 Instructions to Governor Murray
 Instructions to Governor Carleton
 Quebec Act (June 22, 1774)
 United States Declaration of Independence (July 4, 1776)
 French Declaration of the Rights of Man and of the Citizen (August 26, 1789)
 Constitutional Act of 1791 (June 10, 1791)
 Ninety-Two Resolutions (February 21, 1834)
 Report of the Royal Commission for the Investigation of all Grievances Affecting His Majesty's Subjects of Lower Canada (1837)
 Lord John Russell's Ten Resolutions (March 6, 1837)
 Declaration of Independence of Lower Canada (February 22, 1838)
 Report on the Affairs of British North America (1839) (February, 1839)
 Act of Union (1840) (February 10, 1841)
 British North America Act 1867 (July 1, 1867)

Confederation 
 Manitoba Act (1870)
 Francoeur motion (1918)
 Statute of Westminster (1931)
 Report of the Rowell-Dafoe-Sirois Royal Commission on Dominion-Provincial Relations (1940)
 Letters Patent (1947)
 Report of the Tremblay Royal Commission of Inquiry on Constitutional Problems (1953)
 Report of the Laurendeau-Dunton Royal Commission on Bilingualism and Biculturalism (1963)
 Official Languages Act (1969)
 Victoria Charter (1971)
 Report of the Gendron Commission of Inquiry on the Situation of the French Language and Linguistic Rights in Quebec (1972)
 Charter of the French Language (1977)
 Report of The Pépin Robarts Commission - Task Force on Canadian Unity (1978)
 Sovereignty-Association Act (1980)
 Canada Act 1982 (1982)
 Meech Lake Accord (1989)
 Beaudoin-Edwards committee report (June 20, 1991)
 Report of the Bélanger-Campeau Commission on the Political and Constitutional Future of Québec (March 27, 1991)
 Allaire Report (January 28, 1991)
 Report of the Parliamentary Committee to Examine Matters Relating to the Accession of Québec to Sovereignty (1992)
 Charlottetown Accord (1992)
 Act Respecting the Future of Quebec (1995)
 1997 Calgary Accord
 Reference re Secession of Quebec (1998)
 Clarity Act (1998)
 Act respecting the exercise of the fundamental rights and prerogatives of the Québec people and the Québec State (1999)

Constitution of Canada
Legal history of Canada